Cringila Lions FC is an Australian soccer club based in Cringila, New South Wales. The team currently participates in the Illawarra Premier League.

Cringila Lions was established in 1968 by the local Macedonian community of Wollongong. They are sometimes referred to as: Cringila United, Cringila United Soccer Club, Cringila Lions Soccer Club, and Cringila Lions Football Club.

Honours
 1977 Second Division League Champions (Reserve Grade)
 1979 First Division Champions
 1988 Youth Grade League Champions
 1993 Bert Bampton Cup Winners
 1993 Premier League Champions
 1993 Premier League Grand Final Winners
 1994 Corrimal Leagues Club Knock-Out Winners
 1994 Charity Shield Winners
 1994 Bert Bampton Cup Winners
 1994 Youth Cup Winners
 1994 Premier League Grand Final Winners
 1995 Charity Shield Winners
 1998 Premier League Champions
 2000 Bert Bampton Cup Winners
 2001 Bert Bampton Cup Winners
 2002 Premier League Youth Grade Champions
 2008 Corrimal Leagues Club Knock-Out Champions
 2008 (U23) Bert Bampton Cup Winners

References

External links
 Cringila Lions Football Club Facebook Page

Macedonian sports clubs in Australia
Illawarra Premier League
Soccer clubs in Wollongong